Mohammad Yakub Ali Chowdhury (Death: 25 July 2015) a Jatiya Party (Ershad) politician and the former Member of Parliament of Patuakhali-3.

Career
Chowdhury was elected to parliament from Patuakhali-3 as a Jatiya Party candidate in 1988.

References

Jatiya Party politicians
4th Jatiya Sangsad members
Year of birth missing (living people)
2015 deaths